Saint-Pierre-d'Autils is a former commune in the Eure department in Normandy in northern France. 

The town of Saint-Pierre-d'Autils is located in the township of Vernon-Nord part of the district of Évreux. The area code for Saint-Pierre-d'Autils is 27588 (also known as code INSEE), and the Saint-Pierre-d'Autils zip code is 27950.

On 1 January 2017, it was merged into the new commune La Chapelle-Longueville. Its habitants are called Petrusians.

Population

See also
Communes of the Eure department

References

Former communes of Eure
Veliocasses